Adelonema is a genus of plants in the family Araceae.

See also
Homalonema
Schismatoglottis

References

Aroideae
Araceae genera